The Mystery of the Chinese Junk is Volume 39 in the original The Hardy Boys Mystery Stories published by Grosset & Dunlap.

This book was written for the Stratemeyer Syndicate by James Duncan Lawrence (who also authored the majority of the Tom Swift Jr. series) in 1959.

Plot summary
The Hardys purchase a Chinese junk named the Hai Hau to ferry passengers to Rocky Isle and make some extra money. Four mysterious men also are interested in the boat because of treasure hidden inside the Hai Hau. The Hai Hau is a stolen ship from Hong Kong. The other of the Hardy's friends including Chet Morton and Sam Radley also join the mystery. Their Chinese-America friend, Jim Foy also lends a hand to them. George Ti-Ming, is a private detective who helps his friend in Hong Kong to find his missing ship. Chin Gok and Mr. Montrose are very interested in the junk because they think that the junk has a treasure. Finally, the Hardys solve the mystery and share their rewards with their friends. Chin Gok, Mr. Montrose and the two phony coastguard members are caught by the Bayport Police Department Chief, Police Chief Collig.

Television adaptation
The book was adapted into a 1967 television pilot of the same name (it was not picked up), scripted by Richard Murphy and directed by Larry Peerce. Tim Matheson and Richard Gates (as Rick Gates) starred as Joe and Frank Hardy, respectively. Teri Garr played Susie, and Jan-Michael Vincent (as Mike Vincent) played Tony Prito.

References

The Hardy Boys books
1959 American novels
1959 children's books
Grosset & Dunlap books